Mobile accessories include any hardware that is not integral to the operation of a mobile smartphone as designed by the manufacturer.

Cases 

Cases, which are designed to attach to, support, or otherwise hold a smartphone, are popular accessories. Case measures are based on the display inches (e.g. 5 inch display). There are different types:
 Pouches and sleeves
 Holsters
 Shells
 Skins
 Fitted cases
 Bumpers
 Flip cases and wallets
 Screen protection and body films
 Drop and shock protection
 Leather case
 Cases with integrated kick stands
 Battery cases
 cases with protection devices

Holsters are commonly used alone for devices that include rubberized padding, and/or are made of plastic and without exposed rigid corners. Heavy duty cases are designed to protect from drops and scratches.

A standing (or kickstand) case keeps the device standing upright. The collapsible kickstand of some horizontal cases holds the device in a flatter or steeper angle, depending on whether it is horizontally placed on a surface clockwise or counter-clockwise. The flat angle allows tapping without pushing the device over, while the steep angle is intended for watching.

Folio cases are a combination of a case and stand, and may include a keyboard (USB for OTG smartphones or bluetooth keyboard).

Skins and design covers can serve for protection and personalization.  These are the result of the relatively "naked" designs produced by manufacturers such as Apple, where the metal and glass components of the device are exposed and vulnerable to damage.  They are distinct from holsters, in allowing use of the device while in the case, but in many instances include a belt clip or other device giving it the functionality of a holster. They are made of hard plastic, rubber, silicone, leather, or adhesive-backed vinyl pieces. Vinyl material may be calendered or cast, with the latter being more expensive.  Calendered vinyl is expected to only be used for short-mid duration (10 years), while cast vinyl is used on a more long-term basis.  Calendered vinyl also tends to shrink in the heat and can be shaped into any form (above 80 degrees Celsius), and may fade in direct sunlight.

Customized phone cases use custom printing.  Different companies have different methods of printing on cases; some utilize sublimation, others Inkjet-printed skins, others dye-sublimation 3D printing methods.

Functional cases can integrate external batteries or a USB, bluetooth, or Wifi keyboard and touchpad.

Anti-loss devices 
Anti-loss keychains can easily locate a smartphone through the GPS and Bluetooth low energy antennas of the phone. Once the user is within range of the smartphone, both the smartphone and device will alert the user. It also can be used to remotely take photographs using Bluetooth.

Phone charms 

Phone charms are used to decorate the device. They attach either by a strap or by plugging into the jack plug.

Mass storage 

Some smartphones feature SD card slots (usually the smaller Micro-SD variant). These, in combination with a compatible SD card, can be used to transfer files from one device to another, or simply to increase the storage capacity of the phone.

Wi-Fi SDs are Wi-Fi communication devices on a special SD card inserted into the SD card slot. They can move pictures to a local computer or an online photo-sharing service.

Additionally, many devices have USB On-The-Go and support USB storage, in most cases using either a special USB micro-B flash drive or an adapter for a standard USB port. Such adapters can also be used with various other USB devices, such as hardware mice and keyboards.

Chargers and external batteries 

Mobile phone chargers have gone through a diverse evolution that has included cradles, plug-in cords and obscure connectors. However, devices built between 2010 and 2020 generally use micro-USB connectors, while newer devices tend to use USB-C.  Apple devices often use proprietary connectors.

External batteries are most commonly stand-alone devices, which can be cabled to the phone's primary charging connector.

Photo accessories 
Smart lenses are larger and more capable than the phone's camera, having optical zoom and other features. The smartphone connects to them over Wi-Fi using an app. They are compatible with most smartphones.
Smart flash can be used also for selfies.

Selfie stick

Selfie sticks are hand-held extensible monopods used to move the devices further away than would have been possible with the reach of the human arm, allowing for the camera to take shots to be taken at angles that would not have been possible before.

Smartphone tripod mount 
A tripod; it is designed to hold the device in place in a fixed location on the ground during the capture of photographs.

HDMI and projector
Micro-USB to HDMI cables are used in smartphones with MHL.

See also
Modular smartphone
Near field communication
Phone theme
Screen protector
Smart camera
Smart band

References

Mobile phones